Josef "Sepp" Puschnig (born 12 September 1946 in Klagenfurt, Austria) is a retired ice hockey player.  He participated at three Winter Olympics.  He was inducted into the International Ice Hockey Federation Hall of Fame in 1999.

Career
Puschnig was born in Klagenfurt, Austria on 12 September 1946.

In 1962, Puschnig made his debut with EC KAC and stayed with the team for 17 seasons. During this time, he won 13 Austrian championship titles while scoring 362 goals. His number has since been retired by the team.

He also participated in three Winter Olympics and eleven Ice Hockey World Championships.

Legacy
In 2012, Puschnig was voted by the Austrian Ice Hockey Federation as the player of the century.

In 2014, Puschnig received the Decoration of Honour for Services to the Republic of Austria.

In his honor, Stadthalle, the home arena of the EC KAC, has a hall dedicated to him.

References

External links
 
 IIHF Hockey Hall of Fame bio

1946 births
Living people
EC KAC players
Ice hockey players at the 1964 Winter Olympics
Ice hockey players at the 1968 Winter Olympics
Ice hockey players at the 1976 Winter Olympics
IIHF Hall of Fame inductees
Olympic ice hockey players of Austria
Sportspeople from Klagenfurt